Orthochromis uvinzae is a species of cichlid endemic to Tanzania where it is only known from its type locality at Uvinza in the middle Malagarasi River drainage.  This species can reach a length of  SL.

References

External links

uvinzae
Fish of Tanzania
Endemic fauna of Tanzania
Fish described in 1998
Taxa named by Lothar Seegers
Taxonomy articles created by Polbot